The 1970 All-Ireland Senior Hurling Championship was the 84th staging of the All-Ireland Senior Hurling Championship, the Gaelic Athletic Association's premier inter-county hurling tournament. The championship began on 3 May 1970 and ended on 6 September 1970.

Kilkenny were the defending champions but were defeated by Wexford in the Leinster final. Kildare, who won the All-Ireland Intermediate Hurling Championship in 1969, were promoted to the senior championship after a long absence. New York sought entry to the All-Ireland series but their request was denied. Galway left the Munster Championship after ten years of participation and reverted to the old system whereby they enter the championship at the All-Ireland semi-final stage.

On 6 September 1970, Cork won the championship following a 6-21 to 5-10 defeat of Wexford in the All-Ireland final. This was their 20th All-Ireland title, their first in four championship seasons.

Cork's Charlie McCarthy was the championship's top scorer with 1-23. Cork's Pat McDonnell was the choice for Texaco Hurler of the Year.

Rule change

As a result of a decision taken at the Gaelic Athletic Association's (GAA) annual congress the previous year, as of 1970 all provincial finals, All-Ireland semi-finals and the All-Ireland final itself were extended to 80 minutes playing time.  Prior to this all championship matches were sixty minutes in duration.

Teams

A total of fourteen teams contested the championship, including thirteen teams from the 1969 championship and one new entrant.

The Leinster championship was extended to seven teams as Kildare entered the provincial series of games.  They had won the All-Ireland title at intermediate level in 1969 and decided to make the step up to the senior grade.

Galway left the Munster championship where they had been playing since the 1959 championship and returned to the old system whereby they entered the All-Ireland semi-finals.

Team summaries

Results

Leinster Senior Hurling Championship

Munster Senior Hurling Championship

All-Ireland Senior Hurling Championship

Championship statistics

Scoring

Widest winning margin: 19 points
Wexford 4-17 : 2-4 Dublin (Leinster semi-final)
Most goals in a match: 11
Cork 6-21 : 5-10 Wexford (All-Ireland final)
Most points in a match: 31
Cork 6-21 : 5-10 Wexford (All-Ireland final)
Most goals by one team in a match: 6
Cork 6-21 : 5-10 Wexford (All-Ireland final)
Most goals scored by a losing team: 5
Wexford 5-10 : 6-21 Cork (All-Ireland final) 
Galway 5-9 : 3-17 Wexford (All-Ireland semi-final)
Most points scored by a losing team: 14 
Kilkenny 3-14 : 4-16 Wexford (Leinster final)

Miscellaneous

 The Leinster final between Kilkenny and Wexford was the first championship game to be played over the course of 80 minutes.

Top scorers

Season

Single game

Hat-tricks

Player facts

Debutantes

The following players made their début in the 1970 championship:

Tom Byrne
Wexford
August 15
Galway
All-Ireland semi-final

Awards

Annual awards

Texaco Hurler of the Year
The Texaco Hurler of the Year was awarded to Pat McDonnell of Cork.

See also

1